Javan Sebastian (born 27 September 1994) is a Scotland international rugby union player. He plays as a tighthead prop for the Scarlets.

Club career
Sebastian has played for Carmarthen Athletic, Llanelli RFC and Carmarthen Quins.

Sebastian has represented Wales at under-16 and under-18 level. He was then signed as part of the Scarlets academy programme and made one competitive appearance for the Scarlets against Sale in the LV Cup.

Sebastian has signed a one-year partnership contract with the Glasgow Warriors which ran until May 2016. It was a full-time professional contract that allowed Sebastian to play for Ayr RFC when not on Warriors duty.

On 21 February 2023, it was announced that Sebastian would depart the Scarlets and join Edinburgh for the 2023–24 season.

International career 
Born in Carmarthen, Sebastian is eligible to play for Wales, but also for Scotland through his father, who was born and raised in Edinburgh.

In June 2021, Sebastian was called up to the Scotland squad for the summer internationals against England A, Romania and Georgia. He was called up again for the Autumn internationals following the withdrawal of Rory Sutherland due to injury. He won his first cap by coming on as a second half substitute during the Autumn Internationals in a match against Japan on the 20th Nov 2021.

References

External links
 
  Quartet pen Glasgow deals
  Player biography

1994 births
Living people
Ayr RFC players
Glasgow Warriors players
Rugby union players from Carmarthen
Scarlets players
Rugby union props
Scotland international rugby union players
Scottish rugby union players
Welsh rugby union players
Welsh people of Scottish descent
Scottish people of Welsh descent